Nies is a surname.  Notable people with the surname include:

Eric Nies (born 1971), American fashion model and television personality
Frank J. Nies, American architect
Franz Xaver Nies (1859–1897), German Catholic missionary
Helen W. Nies (1925–1996), United States federal judge
Jack Nies (born 1937), American basketball referee
John Nies (born 1967), American football player and model
Susanne Nies, German businesswoman